Gorenje Nekovo is a small settlement in the Municipality of Kanal ob Soči in western Slovenia. Until 2008, the area was part of the settlement of Ajba. The settlement is part of the traditional region of the Slovenian Littoral and is included in the Gorizia Statistical Region.

References

External links
Gorenje Nekovo on Geopedia

Populated places in the Municipality of Kanal
Populated places established in 2008
2008 establishments in Slovenia